Angorangora is a settlement in Kenya's Turkana County. It has an estimated population of 134 people.

History 
Before the Kenyan general election in 2013, Angorangora voted as part of the Rift Valley Province.

References 

Populated places in Turkana County